"X X X" (Kiss Kiss Kiss) is the thirty-ninth single by L'Arc-en-Ciel, released on October 12, 2011. The single debuted at number one on the Oricon chart and remained for over a week, selling 81,414 copies. The band had not reached the top of the Oricon chart since the release of "Drink It Down" in 2008.

This single also included the first of a new group of B-Sides, the L'Acoustic versions, after the earliest release, "Good Luck My Way", ended with the introduction of the alter-ego band P'unk-en-Ciel.

Track listing

References

2011 singles
L'Arc-en-Ciel songs
Oricon Weekly number-one singles
Billboard Japan Hot 100 number-one singles
RIAJ Digital Track Chart number-one singles
Songs written by Hyde (musician)
2011 songs